Tanwater was a special water treatment project initiated  by Elmo tannery in Sweden in 1992.
The aim was to reduce nitrogen effluent from the water treatment systems during the tanning of leather. Previously tanneries in Europe had only  been able to reduce nitrogen in the water by up to a maximum of 30%. The "Tanwater" project aimed at reducing nitrogen waste by up to 80% and finally was able to achieve 89% nitrogen-waste reduction in the water. This was a major breakthrough for the tanning industry because nitrogen is a pollutant of ground water. 

Elmo tannery received a grant for the project from LIFE (The Financial Instrument for the Environment). LIFE finances environmental projects in the European Union. Elmo tannery, although producing leather predominantly for the car industry (upholstery leather), also produces leather for handbags and footwear. Since Elmo started this project there have been a number of tanneries that have followed in its steps of improving their water treatment systems in Sweden and Norway.

References
https://web.archive.org/web/20090115001900/http://ec.europa.eu/environment/life/themes/water/best.htm
http://www.tanwater.net/
http://www.tanwater.net/file/Layman-uk.pdf
https://web.archive.org/web/20061110041537/http://www.euroleather.com/doc/frendruptan.doc

Waste treatment technology